Sølyst may refer to:

 Sølyst (Klampenborg), an estate north of Copenhagen, Denmark
 Sølyst, Stavanger, an island in Stavanger, Norway